Dave McAlpin is an Administrative Law Judge in Helena, Montana. He serves as Chairman of the Montana Tax Appeal Board. He was appointed to the Board by Gov. Steve Bullock in 2013 and unanimously confirmed to the six-year term by a vote of the Montana State Senate.  He was designated Chairman in 2015.

McAlpin was appointed by the MT Attorney General to direct the Montana State Crime Laboratory from 2009 to 2012.  He is the only Montana Director elected by his peers to the Board of Directors of the American Society of Crime Lab Directors.

A former Democratic member of the Montana House of Representatives, he represented House District 94 in Missoula during the 2005, 2007, and 2009 legislative sessions until his appointment to the Crime Lab. In 2006 he was selected to join the Aurthur S. Flemming Fellows of the Institute of Progressive Leadership.  While serving in the Montana Legislature, he served on the Taxation committee and was elected to House Leadership as Minority Whip. He managed the Smokeless States Initiative in Montana for the Robert Wood Johnson Foundation from 2001 to 2003.  He was Executive Director of Court Appointed Special Advocates (CASA) in Missoula. McAlpin served as a congressional aide to Rep. Pat Williams (D-MT) and Sen. Max Baucus (D-MT) in Washington, DC and Montana.  He was the Chief Deputy Clerk of the Montana Supreme Court from 1995 to 1998.

External links
 http://mtab.mt.gov/Aboutmtab/Members
Montana House of Representatives - Dave McAlpin official MT State Legislature website
Project Vote Smart - Representative Dave McAlpin (MT) profile
Follow the Money - Dave McAlpin
2006 2004 campaign contributions

Democratic Party members of the Montana House of Representatives
Living people
Year of birth missing (living people)